The Ensemble de Lancement Soyouz (ELS) (in English Soyuz Launch Complex) is a launch complex at the Guiana Space Centre in Kourou/Sinnamary, French Guiana. It is used by Soyuz-ST rockets: modified versions of the Soyuz-2 optimised for launch from Kourou under Soyuz at the Guiana Space Centre programme.

History
The first launch to use the complex occurred on 21 October 2011, when a Soyuz ST-B launched the first two Galileo In Orbit Validation spacecraft.

The site's equatorial latitude allows a greater payload mass to be delivered into geosynchronous transfer orbit compared to existing Soyuz launch facilities at the Baikonur Cosmodrome in Kazakhstan.

ELS is fifteen kilometres north-west of the launch facilities used by Ariane rockets.

It consists of a single launch pad, with a horizontal assembly and processing facility, or MIK, located 700 metres away. As with the Soyuz launch complexes at Baikonur and Plesetsk, the pad is connected to the MIK by means of a wide gauge railway, along which the rocket is transported before erection at the pad.

Unlike other Soyuz launch complexes, the pad features a mobile service tower, where the payload is integrated when the rocket is in the vertical position; at Baikonur and Plesetsk the payload is horizontally integrated in the MIK before the rocket is moved to the pad. The tower shrouds the rocket during integration, but is moved back to a safe distance (again on rails) prior to launch.

ELS also differs in having a fixed launch mount, rather than one which can be rotated, meaning that the rocket may need to execute a roll manoeuvre during its ascent to orbit. Earlier rockets in the R-7 family were incapable of rolling, so their launch complexes were built to allow launch azimuth to be adjusted before launch.

In 2015 after the quantity of payload orders requiring fuelling at the launch complex S3B site had been identified as a possible bottleneck in flight operations FCube, a new clean room fuelling facility dedicated to the Fregat upper stage and potentially additional small satellite payloads was built which will cut fuelling times from five weeks to as little as one.

On 26 February 2022, Roscosmos announced that it was suspending operations at ELS as a reaction to International Sanctions following the Russo-Ukrainian War. According to Stephane Israel, CEO of Arianespace, "there will no longer be Soyuz launchs" from the Guiana Space Center.

Launch history

Gallery

References

Buildings and structures in Sinnamary
Guiana Space Centre